Events from the year 1785 in Denmark.

Incumbents
 Monarch – Christian VII
 Prime minister – Andreas Peter Bernstorff

Events
 22 June – The Academy of Surgery is founded in Copenhagen, replacing the Theatrum Anatomico-chirurgicum from 1736.

Undated

Births
 16 January – Frederikke Løvenskiold, composer (died 1876)
 24 March  Else Schøtt, operatic soprani (died 1989)

Deaths
 28 May – Johan Peter Suhr, businessman (born 1712)
 10 September – Otto Thott, count, minister of state and bibliophile (born 1703)
 29 December – Johan Herman Wessel, poet (born 1742)

References

 
1780s in Denmark
Denmark
Years of the 18th century in Denmark